Penn of Pennsylvania is a 1941 British historical drama film directed by Lance Comfort and starring Deborah Kerr, Clifford Evans, Dennis Arundell, Henry Oscar, Herbet Lomas and Edward Rigby. The film depicts the life of the Quaker founder of Pennsylvania, William Penn. It is also known by the alternative title Courageous Mr. Penn.

Story
The film portrays his struggle to be granted a colonial charter in London and attracting settlers to his new colony as well as his adoption a radical new approach with regard to the treatment of the Native Americans.

Cast
 Clifford Evans as William Penn
 Deborah Kerr as Gulielma Maria Springett
 Dennis Arundell as Charles II
 Aubrey Mallalieu as Chaplain
 D.J. Williams as Lord Arlington
 O. B. Clarence as Lord Cecil
 James Harcourt as George Fox
 Charles Carson as Admiral Penn
 Henry Oscar as Samuel Pepys
 Max Adrian as Elton
 John Stuart as Bindle
 Maire O'Neill as Cook
 Edward Rigby as Bushell
 Mary Hinton as Lady Castlemaine
 Joss Ambler as Lord Mayor
 Edmund Willard as Captain
 Percy Marmont as Holme
 Gibb McLaughlin as Indian Chief
 Herbert Lomas as Captain Cockle
 Gus McNaughton as Mate

Production
The idea of a film about Penn was developed by the producer Richard Vernon. After listening to a radio broadcast by President Franklin Delano Roosevelt, Vernon had been struck by how similar his views were to the Quaker philosophy of William Penn the next morning he approached bosses at British National Films and pitched the idea of a Penn biopic to them, securing their support. Anatole de Grunwald hastily wrote a screenplay and the film began production at Elstree Studios on 10 February 1941.

Deborah Kerr, a rising star, although not yet 20 years old, was given equal billing with Clifford Evans, who played Penn, but had far less screen time as the film primarily focused on Penn rather than her portrayal of his wife. The film concentrates of Penn's emblematic importance rather than simply as a historic individual, and he serves as a broader depiction of a freedom-loving Englishman. The musical score was written by William Alwyn, the first time he had written for a feature film. His score is generally considered far superior to the film itself.

Made during the Second World War the film was intended in part as a propaganda effort to stir the United States out of isolationism and persuade it into joining the war on Britain's side, and was one of a series of historical films including The Prime Minister, The Young Mr. Pitt and The Great Mr. Handel which were made at the same time, as well as Thunder Rock and 49th Parallel which portrayed a similar message in a contemporary setting.

Reception
The film received universally bad reviews which criticised the lack of vitality in the historical figures who often resembled stereotypes. When it was released in the United States the New York Times observed "Penn is definitely not one of England's better film efforts". Evans's portrayal of Penn was generally praised for his "sympathetic" performance. Shortly afterwards, Lance Comfort directed Kerr in Hatter's Castle, which proved a major success.

References

Bibliography
 Capua, Michelangelo. Deborah Kerr: A Biography. McFarland & Company, 2010.
 Johnson, Ian. William Alwyn: the art of film music. The Boydell Press, 2005.
 McFarlane, Brian. Lance Comfort. Manchester University Press, 1999.
 Wright, Adrian. The innumerable dance: the life and work of William Alwyn. The Boydell Press, 2008.

External links

1941 films
British historical drama films
British biographical drama films
1940s biographical drama films
1940s historical drama films
Films about Christianity
Films about Quakers
Films directed by Lance Comfort
Films set in the 17th century
Films set in the 18th century
Films set in Pennsylvania
Films set in the Thirteen Colonies
Films set in London
Films with screenplays by Anatole de Grunwald
Films scored by William Alwyn
British black-and-white films
1941 directorial debut films
1941 drama films
Cultural depictions of Charles II of England
Films shot at British National Studios
1940s English-language films
1940s British films